TVP3 Łódź is one of the regional branches of the TVP, Poland's public television broadcaster. It serves the entire Łódź Voivodeship.

External links 
Official website

1956 establishments in Poland
Eastern Bloc mass media
Mass media in Łódź
Telewizja Polska
Television channels and stations established in 1956